Apocalyptic is the third studio album by Swedish death metal band Evocation. It was released on 29 October 2010 through Cyclone Empire Records and in North America on 9 November 2010 through Metal Blade Records.

Track listing

Personnel

Evocation
 Janne Kenttäkumpu Bodén – drums, backing vocals
 Martin Toresson – bass
 Thomas Josefsson – vocals
 Vesa Kenttäkumpu – guitars
 Marko Palmén – guitars

Miscellaneous staff
 Anton Hedberg – photography
 Michael Xaay Loranc – cover art, layout, artwork
 Kristian Wåhlin – logo
 Christian Silver – mastering
 Vesa Kenttäkumpu – recording, mixing, production, engineering
 Roberto Laghi – production (drums)

References

2010 albums
Evocation (band) albums
Metal Blade Records albums